Tablet is an online magazine focused on Jewish news and culture. The magazine was founded in 2009 and is supported by the Nextbook foundation. Its editor-in-chief is Alana Newhouse.

History 
Tablet was founded in 2009 with the support of the Nextbook foundation, as a redeveloped and news-focused version of the Jewish literary journal Nextbook. Its reporting has largely focused on Jewish news and culture.

In 2012, Tablet published a review of Breaking Bad by author Anna Breslaw in which Breslaw criticized Holocaust survivors, including those in her family, as "villains masquerading as victims who, solely by virtue of surviving (very likely by any means necessary), felt that they had earned the right to be heroes [...] conniving, indestructible, taking and taking." Jeffrey Goldberg observed in The Atlantic that Tablet had "brought together Commentarys John Podhoretz and The Nations Katha Pollitt [...] by publishing a vicious attack on Holocaust survivors", and called for the magazine to publish an apology to Holocaust survivors. In In These Times, staff writer Lindsay Beyerstein described the article as "the worst thing that Tablet has ever published" and "a disgrace on every level".

In February 2015, Tablet tested a monetization method in which viewers could read articles for free but were required to pay to comment on them. Commenting cost $2 per day, $18 per month, or $180 per year.

In October 2017, Tablet published an article by contributor Mark Oppenheimer titled "The Specifically Jewish Perviness of Harvey Weinstein". The article argued that the sexual assaults by Harvey Weinstein were distinctly Jewish, and was shared favorably by David Duke and neo-nazi Richard Spencer. Oppenheimer issued an apology for the piece, which was described in Jewish left-leaning quarterly magazine Jewish Currents as both supporting "an antisemitic stereotype" and avoiding discussion of "the rampant misogyny that exists in both the Jewish and non-Jewish worlds".

In August 2018, while Julia Salazar was campaigning for election to the New York State Senate, Tablet published an article questioning Salazar's claims that she was Jewish and an immigrant. Jewish Currents published an interview in which Salazar responded to the Tablet piece.

After the Pittsburgh synagogue shooting in 2018, Tablet editor-in-chief Alana Newhouse and all six members of the magazine's editorial staff traveled to Pittsburgh to report on the shooting and its aftermath. Newhouse told The New York Times that "large-picture stories [and] the big-picture trends on right-wing radicalization" could be "left for think pieces for later", stating that Tablet staff were "focused on pieces where we could root them in the stories of actual human beings affected by this one way or the other." The magazine's coverage included reporting on the funerals of people killed in the shooting, and a special edition of their podcast Unorthodox.

In December 2018, Tablet published an article about the Women's March in Washington, DC after the election of Donald Trump as president. It argued that Women's March leaders had excluded Jewish women from leadership positions and used antisemitic language since the organization began in 2016. It especially critiqued connections to Louis Farrakhan. The article came after months of growing pressure on the group, including local chapters issuing critiques and the National Organization for Women ending financial support (though still encouraging members to attend Women's March events). The organizers spoke against Farrakhan's most extreme statements, issued an apology, and made organizational changes to better include Jews in leadership. However, the leadership did not generally condemn Farrakhan, an act that led to enduring backlash.

In April 2021, Tablet published an article by the researchers behind a study which found that, in contrast to the general consensus that education reduces antisemitism, more highly educated people may be more antisemitic. The survey was based on the concept of a double standard, and asked questions of respondents while showing them one of two examples, where only one was related to Judaism; for example, one question asked whether public gatherings during the COVID-19 pandemic "posed a threat to public health and should have been prevented," and provided either Black Lives Matter protests or Orthodox Jewish funerals as examples. The researchers asserted in Tablet that respondents to the questions should have answered similarly regardless of the examples given, and that respondents' tendencies to apply principles more harshly to Jews than non-Jews was an indication of antisemitism.

On September 29, 2022, the Association for Jewish Studies (AJS) "paused" a relationship with Tablet which had enabled the magazine to place advertisements through AJS. The pause came in response to complaints by AJS members about the content published by Tablet; Jewish Currents reported that the critiques centered around articles published in Tablet within the past 5 years. Progressive magazine Jewish Currents also noted in an email newsletter that several Tablet contributors are Trump supporters and asserted that "much of the magazine’s content is focused on decrying liberal 'wokeness'", arguing that while Tablet initially "gained a reputation for publishing high-quality arts and culture content", a conservative editorial line became more pronounced during the presidency of Donald Trump.

Staff 
Tablets editor-in-chief is Alana Newhouse. Her husband David Samuels is literary editor. Liel Leibovitz is editor-at-large, and Lee Smith is a contributor.

In 2011, Tablet announced that Jeffrey Goldberg would move his blog from the website of The Atlantic to Tablet. Goldberg corroborated the announcement in June 2011. However, he never took this action and continued to publish in The Atlantic. In May 2016, after Tablet literary editor David Samuels published a profile of Obama advisor Ben Rhodes in The New York Times Magazine that described Goldberg as a "handpicked Beltway insider" who helped to "retail" the arguments of the Obama administration in support of the Iran deal, Goldberg attributed the negative characterization to a "longtime personal grudge" held by Samuels as a result of Goldberg's decision not to move to Tablet.

Sasha Senderovich and Shaul Magid have both become critical of Tablet after initially contributing work to it. Senderovich left the magazine after a series of 2017 articles in which Liel Leibovitz defended Trump adviser Sebastian Gorka, while Magid left in 2021 after feeling that his internal criticism of conservative content was ineffective.

References

External links
 

Online magazines published in the United States
Jewish culture
Jewish magazines published in the United States
Jewish websites
Magazines established in 2009
Secular Jewish culture in the United States
2009 establishments in the United States